Two ships of the United States Navy have borne the name USS Kickapoo:

, was a  commissioned 8 July 1864 and sold at auction 12 September 1874
, was renamed Mahopac prior to launch 24 February 1919

United States Navy ship names